

Radio Groups 
Latvijas Radio (LSM)
Latvijas Radio 1: Talk and news
Latvijas Radio 2: Latvian music and news
Latvijas Radio 3 - Klasika: Classical music and news
Latvijas Radio 4 - Doma Laukums: News, all thematic programms and music (in Russian language)
Latvijas Radio 5 - Pieci.lv: Top 40
Latvijas Radio 6 - Radio NABA: Student radio, alternative, classic rock, jazz, electro (Riga 95.8 FM)

SWH Group
Radio SWH - Hot Adult Contemporary
SWH Plus - Russian language music hits (in Russian language)
SWH Rock - Rock music
SWH Gold - Soft Pop, Lounge un Contemporary Easy Listening from all times (Riga 90.0 FM and Saldus 104.4 FM)
SWH Spin - Students radio and new music hits (Liepaja 94.6 FM and Ventspils 99.9 FM)
SWH LV - Latvian music from all times (Ventspils 104.5 FM)

EHR Group
Radio EHR - Top 40 and new music
SuperHits - Hit music last decades
Latviešu Hiti - Latvian music
Russkie hity - Russian music (in Russian language)
Retro FM Latvia - Retro music (in Russian language)

TV3 Group
Star FM - Hot Adult Contemporary
TOP Radio - Dance music/Russian hits (in Russian language)

Silver Group
Relax FM - Easy music
Avtoradio Latvia - Music hits (in Russian language) (Riga 103.2 and Kraslava 96.1 FM)
Radio Roks - Russian rock (in Russian language) (Riga 88.6 FM)

Mix Media Group (Russian language radio group)
Radio Baltkom - News&Talk (Riga 93.9 FM and Ventspils 88.5 FM)
Mix FM - Music from 90's (Riga 102.7 FM)
Lounge FM - Lounge&Jazz music (Riga 99.5 FM)

Other national radio stations 
Latvijas Kristīgais Radio - Christian news, music and talk
Radio Marija Latvija - Religious
Radio TEV - Hot Adult Contemporary
Radio Skonto - Pop music and news
Radio Skonto Plus - Russian language music station (Riga 102.3 FM)

Regional radio stations 
 Kurzemes Radio - Hot Adult Contemporary, news from Kurzeme region
 Latgolys radeja - Music and talk in Latgalian dialect
 Divu Krastu Radio - Popular music from the 70s-90s

Local radio stations 
Radio Merkus - Retro music (Riga 1485 AM)
Radio Tsentr - Christian radio/Religious (in Russian language) (Riga 1602 AM)
BBC World Service - BBC International radio (in English language) (Riga 100.5 FM)
Radio 9 - Pop music (in Russian language) (Jurmala 99.0 FM)
Radio 7 - Relax and easy listening (Sigulda 89.8 FM)
Radio 1 - Hot AC and news (Jekabpils 107.0 FM and Preili 91.6 FM)
Radio Ef-Ei - Music and talk (Rezekne 91.4 FM)
Radio Rezekne - Music and news (in Russian language) (Rezekne 105.1 FM)
Alise Plus - Music and news (in Russian language) (Daugavpils 101.6 FM)

References

Latvia
Radio